Holyoakia is a genus of very small (up to 7½ mm long) trilobites of the family Dorypygidae, from the late Lower Cambrian (Late Botonian) of South Australia and Antarctica.

Etymology 
H. simpsoni was named in honor of David Simpson from Adelaide, who collected the first specimens.

Distribution 
 H. granulosa has only been collected from the late Lower Cambrian of Antarctica (presumably Botomian, Shackleton Limestone, Central Transantarctic Mountains)
 H. simpsoni only occurs in the late Lower Cambrian of South Australia (mid-late Botomian, Emu Bay Shale, Big Gully, Kangaroo Island).

Taxonomy 
The genus was originally with reservation placed in the Emuellidae. The genus however lacks the specific characteristics of this family, most notably, the clearly furrowed glabella that is rounded at the frontal end, the hook-shaped eye ridges that run parallel to the margin of the head shield (or cephalon), clearly distinguishable prothorax of six segments, the most backward one with much larger spines than all others, and opistothorax of many segments, while the pygidium is tiny. Holyoakia however, has a rectangular glabella, difficult to discern eye ridges, a thorax of eight segments which is not differentiated and has no macropleural segment, and the pygidium is not much smaller than the cephalon.

Ecology 
H. simpsoni occurs together with Redlichia takooensis, Estaingia bilobata, Balcoracania dailyi, and Megapharanaspis nedini.

Key to the species

References

Further reading 

 
 
 
 
 

Corynexochida genera
Dorypygidae
Cambrian trilobites
Trilobites of Antarctica
Trilobites of Australia
Fossil taxa described in 1995